The 1974 New Hampshire gubernatorial election was held on November 5, 1974. Incumbent Republican Governor Meldrim Thomson Jr. defeated Democratic nominee Richard W. Leonard with 51.15% of the vote.

Primary elections
Primary elections were held on September 10, 1974.

Democratic primary

Candidates
Hugh J. Gallen, State Representative
Richard W. Leonard, former Air Force pilot and state legislator
Harry V. Spanos, State Senator

Results

Republican primary

Candidates
Ralph Brewster
Elmer E. Bussey, perennial candidate
David L. Nixon, State Senator
Meldrim Thomson Jr., incumbent Governor

Results

General election

Candidates
Richard W. Leonard, Democratic
Meldrim Thomson, Republican

Results

References

Bibliography
 
 
 

1974
New Hampshire
Gubernatorial
November 1974 events in the United States